Thomas Hall Seabron Jr. (born May 24, 1957) is a former American football player. He played college football for the University of Michigan from 1975 to 1978 and professional football in the National Football League (NFL) for the San Francisco 49ers (1979–1980) and St. Louis Cardinals (1980).

Early years
Seabron was born in Baltimore, Maryland, in 1957.  He attended high school in Detroit, Michigan at Cass Technical High School.

University of Michigan
Seabron played college football for the Michigan Wolverines football team from 1975 to 1978.  He played at the tight end and defensive end positions in 1975 and 1976 and at the outside linebacker position in 1977 and 1978.

Professional football
Seabron was drafted by the San Francisco 49ers in the fifth round (111th overall selection) in the 1979 NFL Draft.  He appeared in 16 games as a linebacker and on special teams for the 49ers in the 1979 and 1980 NFL seasons.  Seabron was released by the 49ers in October 1980 after appearing in six games.  He signed with the St. Louis Cardinals as a free agent in the first half of December 1980 and appeared in the final two games of the 1980 NFL season for the team.  Seabron was released by the Cardinals in August 1981.

References

1957 births
Living people
American football linebackers
Arizona Cardinals players
Cass Technical High School alumni
Michigan Wolverines football players
Players of American football from Baltimore
Players of American football from Detroit
San Francisco 49ers players